Ryu Bun-hwa (born 26 December 1959) is a North Korean boxer. He competed in the men's light welterweight event at the 1980 Summer Olympics.

References

1959 births
Living people
North Korean male boxers
Olympic boxers of North Korea
Boxers at the 1980 Summer Olympics
Place of birth missing (living people)
Asian Games medalists in boxing
Boxers at the 1982 Asian Games
Asian Games silver medalists for North Korea
Medalists at the 1982 Asian Games
Light-welterweight boxers
20th-century North Korean people